Jupha Somnet (born 26 April 1993) is a Malaysian road and track cyclist. She won the silver medal in the points race and the bronze medal in the scratch at the 2016 Asian Cycling Championships.

Early life
Jupha is the fourth of five siblings growing up in Chuping, Perlis. Jupha was surrounded by people who were into sports. Her aunt was the assistant to coach Muhammad Affendy who coached the Perlis Cycling Team. When she was 14 years old, Jupha moved to Sekolah Sukan Bandar Penawar where she took the sport seriously. Jupha finished her studies at Bukit Jalil Sports School.

Major results

2010
 Asian Junior Track Championships
2nd  500m time trial
2nd  Team sprint
3rd  Scratch
3rd  Sprint
2011
 1st  Team sprint, Southeast Asian Games
 Asian Junior Track Championships
2nd  500m time trial
2nd  Scratch
2nd  Team pursuit
2nd  Team sprint
3rd  Keirin
2012
 1st  Road race, National Road Championships
2013
 1st Scratch, ACC Track Asia Cup, Thailand
 2nd Time trial, National Road Championships
 3rd  Points race, Asian Track Championships
2014
 2nd Omnium, Japan Track Cup 2
 2nd Omnium, South East Asian GP Track (1)
 2nd Points race, South East Asian GP Track (2)
 Track Clubs ACC Cup
2nd Omnium
3rd Keirin
3rd Points race
 3rd  Points race, Asian Track Championships
 3rd Omnium, South East Asian GP Track (3)
2015
 1st Omnium, South East Asian GP Track (1)
 1st Omnium, South East Asian GP Track (2)
 3rd  Criterium, Southeast Asian Games
2016
 Asian Track Championships
2nd  Points race
3rd  Scratch
 3rd Omnium, Taiwan Hsin-Chu Track International Classic
2017
 1st Scratch, Taiwan Cup Track International Classic II
 Southeast Asian Games
2nd  Criterium
2nd  Road race
3rd  Omnium
2018
 1st  Points race, Asian Track Championships
2019
 1st  Road race, National Road Championships
 2nd China Scenic Avenue I
 4th Road race, Southeast Asian Games
2021
 2nd  Team road race, Southeast Asian Games
 2nd Road race, National Road Championships

References

External links
 

1993 births
Living people
Malaysian track cyclists
Malaysian female cyclists
People from Perlis
Malaysian people of Thai descent
Commonwealth Games competitors for Malaysia
Cyclists at the 2014 Commonwealth Games
Asian Games competitors for Malaysia
Cyclists at the 2014 Asian Games
Cyclists at the 2018 Asian Games
Southeast Asian Games medalists in cycling
Southeast Asian Games gold medalists for Malaysia
Southeast Asian Games silver medalists for Malaysia
Southeast Asian Games bronze medalists for Malaysia
Competitors at the 2011 Southeast Asian Games
Competitors at the 2015 Southeast Asian Games
Competitors at the 2017 Southeast Asian Games
Competitors at the 2019 Southeast Asian Games
Competitors at the 2021 Southeast Asian Games
21st-century Malaysian women